Gregory Norman Kane (born 12 October 1952) is a former New Zealand rugby union player. A second five-eighth and three-quarter, Kane represented Waikato, Wellington and Bay of Plenty at a provincial level, and was a member of the New Zealand national side, the All Blacks, in 1974. He played seven matches for the All Blacks but did not appear in any internationals.

References

1952 births
Living people
Rugby union players from Tauranga
People educated at Tauranga Boys' College
New Zealand rugby union players
New Zealand international rugby union players
Waikato rugby union players
Wellington rugby union players
Bay of Plenty rugby union players
Rugby union centres